The third season of the Mexican anthology drama television series Sin miedo a la verdad was ordered by Las Estrellas on 9 July 2019, and it premiered simultaneously in Mexico on Las Estrellas and in the United States on Univision on 9 March 2020, and ended on 24 April 2020.

Cast 
 Álex Perea as Manuel "Manu / Gus" Montero
 Fermín Martínez as Procurator Horacio Escamilla
 Dacia González as Catalina Gómez Juárez "Doña Cata"
 Anna Ciocchetti as General Brigadier Mora
 Jackie Sauza as Agent Andrea Loera
 Ligia Uriarte as Leticia Murillo "Lety" / Mariana Urquiza "Marián"
 Tania Niebla as Berenice Hidalgo "Bere"
 Jorge Navarro Sánchez as Ángel Armando Soto
 Iván Bronstein as General Ignacio Abascal
 Luis Gerardo Rivera as Adrián
 Santiago Rodríguez Rojas as Joaquín
 Gabriel Ronquillo as Edgar
 Ricardo Franco as Lieutenant Nico
 Gaby Mezone as Gaby
 Paco de la Fuente as Francisco "Paco" Zavala
 Ximena Falcón as Vanessa Lozada
 Eduardo Yáñez as President Emiliano Lozada

Production 
On 16 January 2020, two actors, Jorge Navarro Sánchez and Luis Gerardo Rivera, died after falling from a bridge during filming near Mexico City.

Episodes

Notes

References 

2020 Mexican television seasons